The 1999 Football League Trophy Final (known as the Auto Windscreens Shield for sponsorship reasons) was the 16th final of the domestic Football League Trophy competition for teams from the Second and Third Division of the Football League.

The match was played at Wembley Stadium on 18 April 1999, and was contested by Millwall and Wigan Athletic. This was Millwall's first appearance at Wembley in a recognised competition, and the club brought around 47,000 of the 55,000 fans in attendance.

Wigan won the match 1–0, with Paul Rogers scoring the winning goal three minutes into injury-time, one of only five goals he scored for the club in three years.

Route to the final

The rounds were split into two sections: North and South. Wigan Athletic were the winning finalists of the Northern Section, and Millwall were the winners of the Southern Final.

Millwall

Wigan Athletic

|}

Match details

External links
Match result & lineups at Soccerbase

EFL Trophy Finals
Football League Trophy Final 2001
Football League Trophy Final 2001
Football League Trophy Final